Zheng Zu (Chinese: 鄭祖), originally known as Fu Manchu (Chinese: 傅满洲 Fù Mǎnzhōu), is a supervillain appearing in American comic books published by Marvel Comics. Based on Sax Rohmer's character of the same name, he is the leader of the Five Weapons Society criminal organization and the father and arch-enemy of Shang-Chi. 

The character debuted in Special Marvel Edition #15 (cover-dated December 1973)  in the Bronze Age of Comic Books, under the name "Fu Manchu", based on the Sax Rohmer character of the same name and adapted into Marvel Comics by Steve Englehart and Jim Starlin. Due to Marvel not owning the rights to the Fu Manchu character, his name was changed to "Zheng Zu".

Tony Leung Chiu-wai portrays a character partially inspired by Fu Manchu called Xu Wenwu in the Marvel Cinematic Universe film Shang-Chi and the Legend of the Ten Rings (2021).

Publication history
The character of Dr. Fu Manchu was created in 1913 by Sax Rohmer. In the early 1970s, writer Steve Englehart and artist Jim Starlin approached DC Comics to adapt the television series Kung Fu into a comic book, as DC's parent company, Warner Communications, owned the rights to the series. DC Comics, however, was not interested in their pitch, believing the show's and the martial arts genre popularity would phase out quickly. The duo then approached Marvel Comics with the idea to create a kung fu-focused original comic. Editor-in-chief Roy Thomas agreed, but only if they would include the Sax Rohmer's pulp villain Dr. Fu Manchu, as Marvel had previously acquired the comic book rights to the character. Englehart and Starlin developed Shang-Chi, a master of kung fu and a previously unknown son of Dr. Fu Manchu. After Marvel's license with the Rohmer estate expired, Master of Kung Fu was cancelled in 1983. in some of his modern appearances, mention is made of his villainous father either in cryptic terms or using a variety of new names. In 2010's Secret Avengers #6–10, writer Ed Brubaker officially sidestepped the entire issue via a storyline where the Shadow Council resurrects a zombified version of Dr. Fu Manchu, only to discover that "Dr. Fu Manchu" was only an alias and that Shang-Chi's father real name was Zheng Zu (Chinese: 鄭祖); in this arc, Zheng Zu's organization is called Hai-Dai. Shang-Chi's half sister Fah Lo Suee was later renamed Zheng Bao Yu in 2013's The Fearless Defenders #8, written by Cullen Bunn.

In 2020, Shang-Chi starred in a self-titled five issue miniseries written by American Born Chinese author Gene Luen Yang with art by Dike Ruan and Philip Tan. In the miniseries, it is revealed that Si-Fan and Hai-Dai were names used by the Five Weapons Society. It is said to be among the five sons of Zheng Zu, each one commands a house and from among them, the supreme leader, Shang-Chi, champion of the House of the Deadly Hand, is chosen by the father, but his sister Zheng Shi-Hua, Sister Hammer takes the lead after her father's death, in the miniseries, there is no mention of Zheng Bao Yu,  Shi-Hua can be seen as Bao Yu's replacement in Shang-Chi's origin. Shang-Chi starred in a new ongoing series by Yang and Ruan in 2021, with Marcus To replacing Ruan by the 9th issue. Following the release of the Marvel Cinematic Universe film Shang-Chi and the Legend of the Ten Rings (2021), Yang incorporated several concepts introduced in the movie into the Shang-Chi mythos, including the character Jiang Li as Shang-Chi's real mother, who was based on Shang-Chi's mother Ying Li, retconning Shang-Chi's white American mother and his mixed-race heritage, which, as in the film, came from the heavenly realm Ta Lo, which was previously introduced by writers Mark Gruenwald, Ralph Macchio and artist Keith Pollard in Thor #310 (1980); and the Ten Rings weapons. Like Wenwu, Zheng Zu invaded Ta Lo and fell in love with Li, with whom he had two children.

Fictional character biography
Born during the early Qing Dynasty, Zheng Zu gained his education at the Tibetan monastery of Rach where he learned martial arts, arcane knowledge, and every known discipline of science. Becoming highly regarded in his monastery, Zheng Zu was considered part of their brotherhood until the day he left to share his gifts with the world. A powerful sorcerer in his own right, Zu, along with his younger brother Zheng Yi and their five disciples, the Deadly Warriors, formed the Five Weapons Society to protect China. His inspiration were weapons from the realm of Ta-Lo, the legendary Five Sets of Heavenly Weapons: One Hammer (Hammer), Two Swords (Sabre), Nine Daggers (Dagger), Three Staffs (Staff) and Ten Rings (Hand).

On one such mission, the Sorcerer Brothers and the Deadly Warriors protected the Tianjin Prefecture from Fin Fang Foom. The Ancient One, a fellow sorcerer and friend, provided the brothers the Eyes of the Dragon, a pair of stones that granted longevity and vigor while requiring the sacrifice of another. By 1860, the brothers had aged decades beyond their natural lifespans through the use of longevity spells and had grown weaker as a result. During the Second Opium War, the Society fought against British forces, but were defeated by Dormammu and the Mindless Ones summoned by the British sorcerer Baron Harkness, resulting in the death of the Deadly Warriors. Zu attempted to use the Eyes of the Dragon to save the fatally wounded Yi at the cost of his own life, but not wanting to rule the Society alone, Yi reversed the spell, granting Zu immortality and restoring his youth, giving him the power to defeat the combined British forces. Following the death of his brother and the Deadly Warriors, Zu led the Society alone, establishing five houses in their honor. Without his brother's guidance, Zu lost his way, becoming increasingly bitter and ruthless. After losing one of the houses during the Boxer Rebellion, Zu renounced his country and followers for their perceived weakness and lied about his brother's death, claiming he killed him for being weak as well and stole his spirit energy to augment his own. Zu subsequently relocated four of the Society's five houses to foreign countries within the Eight-Nation Alliance to monitor those who had fought against China and the Society during the conflict.   

For the next century while building his criminal empire, Zu would steal the life essences of his blood relatives, including those from numerous offspring he fathered in order to preserve his longevity.  Zu would lose possession of the Eyes but created the Elixir Vitae to prolong his longevity. Over time, Zu would use many aliases for himself and the Society, eventually choosing the name "Dr. Fu Manchu" and renaming the Society as the "Si-Fan".    

When his daughter Zheng Bao Yu was a child, Zheng Zu showed her the Moon, where he said that he would one day have the power to move one world in order to rule another world.

Zheng Zu was revealed to have discovered the knowledge of Jack the Ripper's methodology.

Zheng Zu later took the woman Mara Ling to be his wife as part of an arranged marriage, despite the fact that she loved a blind archer named Li.

Zheng Zu discovered the existence of the heavenly realm of Ta Lo and planned to steal the Five Sets of Heavenly Weapons to bolster the Five Weapons Society. Upon arriving at Qilin Island, the gateway between Earth and Ta Lo, Zu was betrayed and left for dead by pirates under his service but was rescued by Jiang Li of the Qilin Riders, a community of mortals from Ta Lo tasked by the Chinese gods to protect the realm from outside threats. While being nursed back to health, Zu fell in love with Jiang Li. When Jiang Li's father, Chieftain Xin, discovered Zu's presence on the island, he ordered his daughter to execute the trespasser but the two fled to the House of the Deadly Hand. When she discovered that Zu led a criminal organization, Jiang Li attempted to leave him but Zu promised to change his evil ways. The two married and had two children: son Shang-Chi and daughter Zheng Shi-Hua. Within the first few years into his marriage, Zheng Zu grew to genuinely love his family. However following an attack by Hydra against the House of the Deadly Hand, Zu became cold and distant towards his family, as he felt that his love for them made him weak, and resumed his plans to infiltrate Ta Lo. Xin and Jiang Li confronted Zu in his personal tower, where they discovered he had constructed a makeshift portal to Ta Lo. While Zu fought his wife and father-in-law, Shang-Chi happened upon the scene, just as the portal's connection to Ta Lo became disconnected and Jiang Li was accidentally pushed through, sending her to the Negative Zone. Zu and Xin blamed each other for Jiang Li's presumed death and each tried convincing Shang-Chi to join them. Shang-Chi sided with his father and threw one of Zu's chemicals at Xin' face, blinding and leaving a scar across his right eye. Xin denounced Shang-Chi to be as evil as his father and fled on his Qilin. Zu subsequently placed a memory spell on Shang-Chi, making him forget the incident. 

During their childhood, Shang-Chi and Shi-Hua accidentally discovered one of their father's secret laboratories in his Hunan retreat. As punishment, their father told Shang-Chi that he gave Shi-Hua a merciful death, explaining that the luxury of human bonds was weakness. In truth, he secretly sent Shi-Hua to the House of the Deadly Hammer in Russia. Shang-Chi would continue to be raised in isolation in his father's Hunan retreat; unbeknownst to Shang-Chi, the Hunan retreat was the House of the Deadly Hand, with Shang-Chi chosen to be its champion. 

Like with Shang-Chi and Shi-Hua, their father selected several of his other children to be raised in the Society's other Houses as their respective champions, with daughter Zheng Zhilan and an unnamed son at the House of the Deadly Staff in Britain, son Takeshi at the House of the Deadly Sabre in Japan and daughter Esme at the House of the Deadly Dagger in France. When Zhilan voiced her plans to reform the Society, Zheng Zu ordered Takeshi to assassinate her, who instead chose to spare her and helped fake her death. Unbeknownst to both, their father ordered her death due to her status as a mutant, whom Zu believed were colonial threats. 

Tony McKay and Sir Denis Nayland Smith later launched an attack on the Si-Fan, after which Zheng Zu captured both of them, killed McKay with a "hellish green liquid" that 'took six seconds" to accomplish and used his Japanese sumo wrestler bodyguard Tak to cripple Smith by crushing his legs. Zheng Zu later introduced schizophrenia to a gorilla which was used as the final guardian of his New York headquarters.

Zheng Zu's African base was raided by the British military, where many of his followers there were killed. Upon finding a disfigured infant named M'Nai after also finding his parents dead, Zheng Zu decided that he could shape M'Nai into a powerful servant and M'Nai was raised alongside Shang-Chi. M'Nai and Shang-Chi became inseparable, even referring to each other as brothers.

Shang-Chi as a boy heard from K'uei Meng that Zheng Zu had plans to rule the world. When Shang-Chi confronted his father, Zheng Zu dismissed it as slander and Shang-Chi never saw K'uei Meng again.

Another event in Shang-Chi's childhood is seeing his father thank a dacoit for saving his life. Years later, that same dacoit was killed by Zheng Zu for failing in his mission.

When Shang-Chi bested his fellow student Ah Lung in combat, Zheng Zu demanded that Shang-Chi kill him. Due to Shang-Chi hesitating, Zheng Zu had his guards kill Ah Lung.

When Zheng Zu had his pupil Sho Teng seemingly betray Shang-Chi to M16 agents that were secretly on Zheng Zu's side, Zheng Zu "rescued" Shang-Chi and killed their leader, Death-Dragon, in order to earn Shang-Chi's trust.

When Shang-Chi was 19, Zheng Zu dispatched Shang-Chi to London to kill Dr. Petrie, who was said by Zheng Zu to be a threat to world peace. Shang-Chi was successful in killing Petrie and was confronted by Nayland Smith, who told Shang-Chi the truth about his father. After meeting with his mother in New York, who confirmed Smith's claims, Shang-Chi fought his way past Zheng Zu's bodyguards at his New York base, where he told his father that they were now enemies.

Zheng Zu later dispatched M'Nai, now calling himself Midnight, to kill Shang-Chi, only for Midnight to perish upon falling off a crane and his cape snagging onto a hook.

Zheng Zu sent his Si-Fan assassin Chow Loo to kill Shang-Chi, only to have Chow Loo fail in his mission. When he tried to cover it up, Zheng Zu had him transformed into a gorilla-like creature to fight Shang-Chi in Los Angeles, where he was killed in battle.

Zheng Zu later tried to move the Moon from its orbit around Earth in an attempt to move one world in order to rule another world (as he had promised Zheng Bao Yu years before) but was defeated by Shang-Chi and his allies.

Under the alias of Wang Yu-Seng, Zheng Zu planned to kidnap Zheng Bao Yu and Shang-Chi to jump-start the Elixir Vitae, which now needed the blood of his own children to return him to full vigor. With the help of the Death-Dealer, Zheng Zu captured Shang-Chi and held him hostage in order to get his blood, only for Shang-Chi to escape. Zheng Zu brought Zheng Bao Yu to Honan to have her blood as he was pursued by Shang-Chi. To combat Shang-Chi, Zheng Zu unleashed a clone of Shang-Chi to fight Shang-Chi, which ended up being bested by Shang-Chi and killed. When a dying Zheng Zu attempted to lap up the clone's blood to save his life, the fortress began to crumble around him as Shang-Chi left his father to meet his doom.

Determined to rid the world of his father's stain, Shang-Chi traveled to A.I.M. Island to determine what his father's connections with A.I.M. were. His findings were inconclusive.

After Zheng Zu's apparent death, the Kingpin takes control of his own faction of the Si-Fan in Hong Kong and provides them cybernetics. Shang-Chi joins forces with the X-Men and Elektra Natchios against the Kingpin's Si-Fan.

Zheng Zu employed Zaran (Zhou Man She) to retrieve a chemical from A.I.M.and later directed him to kill Shang-Chi for him.

Zheng Zu later sent his dacoits to aid Zaran against Shang-Chi and the Marvel Knights. Although they succeeded in destroying the building that Shang-Chi was in, Zaran failed to slay him.

Using the aliases of the Comte de St. Germain and the Ghost, Zheng Zu employed his son, Moving Shadow, as he prepared the Hellfire weapon. He was opposed again by MI-6 and Shang-Chi, with the resulting battle destroying the Hellfire weapon.

Under the alias of Han, Zheng Zu offered his daughter Kwai Far to the Black Panther as a prospective bride. The Black Panther refused this offer and drove him off with the assistance of Luke Cage and Shang-Chi.

Zheng Zu eventually died sometime after his last encounter with his son. Aloysius Thorndrake of the Shadow Council had somehow partially resurrected Shang-Chi's father, whose real name was revealed to be Zheng Zu (with "Fu Manchu" being one of his many aliases)  and his organization is called the Hai-Dai, the Shadow Council agents are digging for the Eyes of the Dragon. Max Fury (a rogue Life Model Decoy of Nick Fury) then reports to Aloysius that they have found the Eyes of the Dragon. Aloysius, Max and Hai-Dai ninjas then move on to the next part of the plan that involves capturing Shang-Chi and using him to restore Zheng Zu to life.

The Prince of Orphans and the Valkyrie arrive at Zheng Zu's grave, where they find a few Shadow Council agents on guard, knowing that someone would come to the grave. They defeat the Shadow Council agents, take one of them prisoner and have him taken to an unknown location. Meanwhile, Max Fury informs Aloysius Thorndrake about the two unfortunate mishaps. Zheng Zu is not pleased, for there is only two days left to complete the ritual needed to restore himself to life. Aloysius promises to Zheng Zu that Max Fury and John Steele will handle this.

Zheng Zu prepares the ritual that will enable him to use Shang-Chi's life-force to resurrect himself. Disguised as a Shadow Council agent, the Moon Knight gives the signal and the Secret Avengers drop in on the Shadow Council. Captain Steve Rogers fights Max Fury, while the Valkyrie fights John Steele. The Prince of Orphans disrupts the ritual, causing Zheng Zu to turn to stone, which the Prince of Orphans then shatters. 

The reveal of Zu's true identity results Fah Lo Suee's real identity, Zheng Bao Yu being revealed as well. Now in full control of the Hai-Dai, Bao Yu resumes her father's long-forgotten experiment of bio-engineering Brood eggs as weapons, which she uses to carry out hits in New York's Chinatown. The plot is uncovered by Misty Knight and Annabelle Riggs of the Fearless Defenders with help from Elsa Bloodstone; the three track Bao Yu and the Hai-Dai assassins and scientists to an underground laboratory. With the help of No-Name of the Brood, the Fearless Defenders defeat the Hai-Dai and destroy the experiments, forcing Bao Yu to teleport away from her lair.

With Zu's death, the title of Supreme Commander of the Five Weapons Society was passed down to his son, Brother Staff. Believing that the Society had been reduced to a "glorified drug ring" under Staff's leadership, Shi-Hua, now known as Sister Hammer, challenges him at the House of the Deadly Staff in London to usurp control of the Society. Despite Hammer defeating and mortally wounding Staff, Zheng Zu's spirit selects Shang-Chi as the new Supreme Commander instead of Hammer. An enraged Hammer assumes control of the Society and sends the Warriors of the Deadly Staff to kill her brother in America. When Shang-Chi is poisoned by Shi-Hua, a dilapidated spirit resembling Zheng Zu commands him to awaken. While Shang-Chi is recuperating at the House of the Deadly Dagger in France, the same spirit beckons him to the House's shrine room. Believing the spirit to be of his father, Shang-Chi obliges, uncovering a shrine dedicated to Zheng Yi and a mysterious map. The spirit reveals that he is actually Yi and disappears before revealing anything else to Shang-Chi. With Takeshi and Esme, Shang-Chi locates Yi's tomb in Henan. While Takeshi and Esme are preoccupied with a monster guardian created by Zu, Shang-Chi is able to reach Yi's grave and converses with his spirit. Zheng Yi reveals the truth about Zheng Zu to his nephew and when Shang-Chi requests his guidance in stopping Shi-Hua and her army of jiangshi, Yi instead tells him to stop running away from his family, warning that losing them would cause him to lose his way, like his father. When Shang-Chi and Shi-Hua are pulled into an astral plane where they relive Shi-Hua's memories of her harsh upbringing in Russia, a vision of Zheng Zu attacks them. Shang-Chi is able to fight and restrain Zu.  Reliving her memories and Shang-Chi's reveal of their father allows Shi-Hua to renounce Zu. When Shang-Chi is named the new Supreme Commander of the Five Weapons Society, Zheng Zu's spirit congratulates him, remarking that he is destined to become like him. 

While imprisoned in the Jade Palace dungeon in Ta Lo, Zheng Zu's spirit visits Shang-Chi to convince him to take the Ten Rings to stop Xin, who kidnapped Jiang Li (who was released from the Negative Zone by Shang-Chi) and plans to destroy their family. Xin, empowered by a taotie mask created from Shang-Chi's blood and Shi-Hua's severed hand, arrives at the dungeon to destroy the Zheng bloodline once and for all. Shang-Chi reluctantly allows his father to guide him to the Jade Emperor's vault containing the Ten Rings, donning them to save his siblings from his grandfather. While fighting Xin, Shang-Chi realizes that Zu's spirit was influencing his thoughts, making him more ruthless and bloodthirsty. Shang-Chi hesitates when Zu orders him to kill Xin, allowing Xin to claim six of the Ten Rings from Shang-Chi and defeat him and his siblings. Shang-Chi fights Xin again at the New House of the Deadly Hand in New York City but loses the remaining Rings. Zu's ghost tells his son that his fear of turning into his father was why Shang-Chi was unable to wield the Ten Rings and urges him to embrace his Zheng lineage to save his family and home. With no other option, Shang-Chi gives in to his dark desires, reclaiming all of the Ten Rings from Xin and unlocking their full potential, giving him a similar appearance and personality to Zu's. Under his father's influence, Shang-Chi was able to easily defeat Xin and his Qilin Riders, using the Ten Rings to destroy their taotie masks. Before a corrupted Shang-Chi could execute Xin, he was talked down by Jiang Li and his siblings. Shang-Chi is brought back to his senses and spares Xin, prompting Zu's spirit to denounce him as a coward before disappearing.

Zheng Zu's bones are extracted from battle between the Secret Avengers and Shadow Council by a gang of disgruntled Society members who attempt to use the remains as part of a ritual to summon a younger version of Zheng Zu to take over the Society.  Shang-Chi and his siblings attempt to stop the ritual but Shang-Chi is accidentally sent back in time to the First Opium War where he encounters younger versions of Zheng Zu, Zheng Yi and that era's Deadly Warriors.  As a younger man, Zu is shown to be heroic and amiable and befriends Shang-Chi.  Zheng Zu and Shang-Chi work together to apprehend a corrupt Constable and part on good terms as Shang-Chi is transported back to the present; Zu remains oblivious to their familial relationship.  Due to the experience, Shang-Chi and his siblings bury Zheng Zu's remains next to his brother's grave and with full funeral rites, honoring the man he once was.

Powers and abilities
Zheng Zu is a genius in every field of knowledge. He is a skilled medical practitioner and surgeon, where he has cultivated various diseases and viruses to use against his enemies.

Zheng Zu is a master of disguise and can pass for any member of the human race, while speaking in their languages without any discernable accent.

Zheng Zu is a master of unarmed combat.

He can hypnotize people with his eyes to the point where few men could gaze into his eyes without falling under his control.

With the revelation of his true identity as the ancient sorcerer Zheng Zu, he is a master in the mystic arts and has discovered the means to immortality.

Other versions

Earth-79816 
Shang-Chi believes that his Zheng Zu is a benefactor, he is shown to be loyal to Zheng Zu and the Five Weapons Society.

Secret Wars (2015)
In Secret Wars, Zheng Zu is the long-reigning emperor of the wuxia-inspired K'un-Lun region of Battleworld. In this continuity, his likeness and abilities are based on the Mandarin, and he is known as the Master of The Ten Rings, a martial arts school that uses mystical powers and techniques based on the powers of the Mandarin's 10 rings from the mainstream continuity. He is also the father of Shang-Chi, who is wanted for the murder of Lord Tuan, the master of the Iron Fist school, the main rival of the Ten Rings school. It is later revealed Zu sent his assassin, Red Sai of the Red Hand school, to assassinate Tuan, but she ultimately failed. To spare his lover and her students from the Emperor's wrath, Shang-Chi killed Tuan; Zu had his son implicated and exiled for the murder to cover up his own involvement. Representing the Ten Rings school, Emperor Zu hosts a tournament held every 13 years to decide who the next ruler of K'un-Lun should be, a position he has won for 100 years. When Shang-Chi returns from his exile to represent his own school, the Lowest Caste, Zu allows him to participate, but alters the rules so that Shang-Chi would have to defeat every representative before facing him in the Thirteen Chambers. During their fight, Zu attempts to kill his son with the Spectral Touch technique, only for the move to pass through him, due to Shang-Chi having learned how to become intangible. Shang-Chi proceeds to use nine of the 10 techniques against his father and ultimately defeats him with the Gorgon's Eye, which turns him into stone. With Zu's defeat, Shang-Chi becomes the new emperor of K'un-Lun.

In other media

Role-playing games 
Fu Manchu appears in the adventures Night Moves and Night Live for the role-playing game Marvel Super Heroes.

Shang-Chi's profile in the Marvel Multiverse Role-Playing Game mentions Zheng Zu and the Five Weapons Society.

Film 
Tony Leung Chiu-wai portrays the character of Xu Wenwu in the live-action Marvel Cinematic Universe: Phase Four film Shang-Chi and the Legend of the Ten Rings (2021). A composite character of Fu Manchu and the Mandarin, based on their Secret Wars depiction, the character has been previously referenced in the Iron Man trilogy and the short film All Hail the King.

Board games 
In the Secret Wars Volume 2 for Legendary: A Marvel Deck Building Game, there is an adaptation of Battleworld version of Zheng Zu as Emperor of K'un-Lun and the Ten Rings school, the emperor's name is spelled Zheng Zhu.

Notes

References

External links
 
 Fu Manchu at Comic Vine
 Zheng Zu at Comic Vine
 
 The Shang Chi Chronology

1973 comics debuts
Comics characters introduced in 1973
Fictional Chinese people
Marvel Comics martial artists
Shang-Chi characters
Characters created by Jim Starlin
Characters created by Steve Englehart
Fu Manchu
Marvel Comics characters who use magic